Ahmad Kanaan (born 1965 in Tamra) is a painter and sculptor.

He received a BFA from Bezalel Academy of Arts and Design in Jerusalem. He is the curator of Jaffa Salon of Palestinian Art. His work includes both paintings and sculptures artwork. He received several national and international awards: in 1989, he was the recipient of the America-Israel Cultural Foundation Prize, and in 2003, and 2010 he received the Artist in the Community Grant, from the Israeli Ministry of Culture.

Career
Kanaan has participated in several solo and group exhibitions in Israel, the West Bank, the US, Japan, Russia, and Germany, including solo shows in Open Museum in Tefen, Museum on the Seam, Wilfrid Israel Museum and The Museum of Islamic Art in Jerusalem.

References

1965 births
Living people
Israeli Arab artists
Palestinian contemporary artists
Arab citizens of Israel